Mukhtar Begum was a Pakistani classical, ghazal singer and actress. She was known as The Queen of Music for singing songs in films and on radio. She worked in Hindi, Punjabi and Urdu films and was known for her roles in films Hathili Dulhan, Ali Baba 40 Chor, Nala Damayanti, Dil ki Pyas, Ankh ka Nasha, Muflis Ashiq and Chatra Bakavali.

Early life
Mukhtar Begum was born in 1901 in Amritsar, British India. Mukhtar was the older sister and she had four siblings, a sister including Farida Khanum and three brothers.

She attended Patiala Gharana's Classic Music School. A teacher named Ustad Mian Meherbaan Khan there liked her singing and he was the teacher of Ustad Aashiq Ali Khan. So he trained Mukhtar Begum in Hindustani vocal classical music since the age of seven.

Career
In the 1930s, she moved to Kolkata and she did stage plays and theatre which were written by famous Urdu playwright and poet Agha Hashar Kashmiri. Mukhtar Begum also went to Bombay and there she also worked in theatre. After doing theatre, she started working in silent films and made her debut in 1931 and she appeared in both Hindi, Punjabi and Urdu films including Nala Damayanti, Dil ki Pyas, Ankh ka Nasha and Muflis Ashiq. Mukhtar Begum also composed songs for two films in which she worked including Prem ki Aag and Bhesham.

In Calcutta, She met Noor Jehan and her family and she encouraged Noor Jehan and her sisters to join films and theater. So she introduced them to some producers and to her husband Agha Hashar Kashmiri.

Mukhtar Begum, along with her family, moved to Pakistan after Partition and she settled in Lahore. She continued to sing ghazals for radio and television. At Lahore, Mukhtar Begum then went to Radio Pakistan. From there, she sang many songs.

Mukhatr Begum also worked as a music teacher and she trained singer Naseem Begum and her own younger sister Farida Khanum in classical music singing and ghazals.

Personal life
Mukhtar married Urdu poet, playwright and dramatist Agha Hashar Kashmiri and Mukhtar's younger sister Farida Khanum is also a famous ghazal singer.

Illness and death
Mukhtar Begum suffered a paralysis and contracted a prolonged illness from which she died on 25 February 1982 at age 80 in Karachi and she was laid to rest at Society's Graveyard in Karachi.

Filmography

Film

References

External links
 

1901 births
20th-century Khyal singers
Singers from Kolkata
Actresses in Hindi cinema
Pakistani radio personalities
20th-century Pakistani women singers
Urdu-language singers
20th-century Indian singers
Muhajir people
20th-century Indian women classical singers
People from British India
20th-century Indian women singers
Women ghazal singers
Indian film actresses
Punjabi-language singers
20th-century Indian women musicians
Radio personalities from Lahore
Indian musical theatre actresses
Pakistani classical singers
20th-century Indian actresses
Patiala gharana
1982 deaths
Pakistani ghazal singers
Indian stage actresses
Punjabi people
Singers from Lahore
People from Amritsar
Hindi-language singers
Punjabi women
20th-century Pakistani actresses
Actresses in Punjabi cinema
Indian silent film actresses
Pakistani women singers
Pakistani stage actresses
Musicians from Amritsar
Pakistani film actresses
Actresses in Urdu cinema